In a group of animals (usually a litter of animals born in multiple births), a runt is a member which is significantly smaller or weaker than the others. Owing to its small size, a runt in a litter faces obvious disadvantage, including difficulties in competing with its siblings for survival and possible rejection by its mother. Therefore, in the wild, a runt is less likely to survive infancy.

Even among domestic animals, runts often face rejection. They may be placed under the direct care of an experienced animal breeder, although the animal's size and weakness coupled with the lack of natural parental care make this difficult. Some tamed animals are the result of reared runts.

Not all litters have runts. All animals in a litter will naturally vary slightly in size and weight, but the smallest is not considered a "runt" if it is healthy and close in weight to its littermates. It may be perfectly capable of competing with its siblings for nutrition and other resources. A runt is specifically an animal who suffered in utero from deprivation of nutrients by comparison to its siblings, or from a genetic defect, and thus is born underdeveloped or less fit than expected.

In popular culture

Literature
 Wilbur, the pig from Charlotte's Web, is the runt of his litter.
 Orson, the pig in Jim Davis' U.S. Acres, is a runt who was bullied by his normal siblings. The strip changed direction when he was moved to a different farm and settled in with a supporting cast of oddball animals.
 Shade the bat from Silverwing is a runt.
 Fiver and Pipkin from Watership Down are runts, and their names in the Lapine language, Hrairoo and Hlao-roo, reflect this fact (the suffix -roo means "Small" or "undersized").
 Clifford the Big Red Dog was born a runt, but inexplicably began to grow explosively until he became 25 feet tall. 
 Cadpig, a female Dalmatian puppy in Dodie Smith's children's novels The Hundred and One Dalmatians and The Starlight Barking, is the runt of her litter and is thought to be stillborn, until Mr. Dearly revives her. 
Ruth, the hero Pernese dragonnet from Anne McCaffrey's novel The White Dragon, is a runt whose egg is smaller and has a harder shell than all others in the clutch. He would have died save for the intervention of young Jaxom.
 Babe, the eponymous piglet hero of Dick King-Smith's book (and the film based on the novel), is a runt. In fact, he was chosen for the competition at which Farmer Hoggett won him essentially because he was a runt - his runt status therefore saving his life and shaping his destiny.
 Scourge from the Warriors book series was a runt. 
 The title character from the novel Runt, as the name implies, is the smallest of his wolf litter.
Little Ann from Where The Red Fern Grows was the runt of her litter, and smaller than her brother Old Dan.
Daggie Dogfoot from Pigs Might Fly by Dick King Smith was the runt of his litter, and it was because he was born a runt he was taken away and came back. He later learns to swim and then saves his pig herd from a flood.
The Big Friendly Giant from Roald Dahl's children's book The BFG is nicknamed "Runt" by other giants who are much bigger and stronger.

Film and television
 Goliath II, in the Disney film of the same name, was a runt elephant. Hardly bigger than a mouse, he was an embarrassment to his father, Goliath I, who was a giant, and resented by the other elephants of the herd, who had to avoid stepping on him. He redeemed himself when he proved to be unafraid of a mouse.
In both the 1961 version and 1996 version of Dodie Smith's 101 Dalmatians, the character of Lucky is portrayed as the runt of the litter (instead of Cadpig). However, the accompanying TV series portrayed Cadpig as the runt again.
The dire wolf named Ghost, in HBO's adaptation of the A Song of Ice and Fire book series, was the runt of his litter of six pups, as well as an albino. In the book, he was the biggest of the six in the litter.
 Runt, an omega wolf from Alpha and Omega series, is a runt among his pack and family.
Patchi, the main character from Walking with Dinosaurs, is the runt of a clutch of pachyrhinosaurus eggs.
Arlo, the main character from The Good Dinosaur, is the runt of his siblings, but born from a big egg.
Mr. Peanutbutter, a main character from BoJack Horseman, is one of the runts from his litter. His brother, Captain Peanutbutter, tells Mr. Peanutbutter that he is his favorite runt of the litter.
Rex, the title character of Rex the Runt, is a runt.
Chief, the main character from Wes Anderson's Isle of Dogs, is the runt of his litter.
Bhoot, the wolf cub of the 2018 film Mowgli: Legend of the Jungle, is the runt of the Akela pack. He becomes Mowgli's best friend.
Shaun the Sheep, from the eponymous TV series and the Wallace and Gromit film "A Close Shave", is the smallest but most intelligent of all the adult sheep in the flock, with only the lamb Timmy being smaller.
In The BFG, the titular character is referred to as "Runt" by the other giants due to him being the smallest out of all the giants.
In the 2005 Disney adaptation of Chicken Little, a character named Runt of the Litter is a large pig that towers over the other characters, but is small compared to the rest of his family.

Real-life instances
 Jock was the runt of a litter of Staffordshire Bull Terriers who was saved from drowning by Sir Percy Fitzpatrick, who later wrote about his life with the dog in Jock of the Bushveld.
Popular YouTube Channel "The Dodo" has many episodes which focus on runts of the litter, most being abandoned either by breeders or their parents, and later revived by rescuers.
 "Runt" was an early career moniker (ca. 1970) for Todd Rundgren, his band, and the title of his/their eponymous first album.

See also
 Vanishing twin

References

Biology terminology
Livestock